The 1976 African Women's Handball Championship was the second edition of the African Women's Handball Championship, held in Algeria. It acted as the African qualifying tournament for the 1976 Summer Olympics qualifying tournament.

Preliminary round

Group A

Group B

Knockout stage

Fifth place game

Third place game

Final

Final ranking

External links
Results on todor66.com

1976 Women
African Women's Handball Championship
African Women's Handball Championship
1976 in Algerian sport
1976 in African handball
Women's handball in Algeria
1976 in African women's sport